Auguste Delisle (1908–2006) was a Canadian clergyman and bishop for the Roman Catholic Diocese of Lokoja. He was appointed bishop in 1955. He was born in 1908 in Montreal, Quebec, and died in 2006.

References 

1908 births
2006 deaths
Canadian Roman Catholics
Canadian Roman Catholic bishops
Clergy from Montreal
Roman Catholic bishops of Lokoja